Kermajärvi (literally Finn. kerma for cream, järvi for lake, Sámi. kierma for rare and threatened Finnish Forest Reindeer fawn, and/or old Eastern Finnish word kiermi for type of fishing net drying stand) is a medium-sized lake in the Vuoksi main catchment area. It is located in the region of Southern Savonia in Heinävesi.

The lake gets its water from Varisvesi of Kallavesi by Karvio Rapids and flows through Kerma and Vihovuonne Rapids to Ruokovesi which flows through Pilppa Rapids to Haukivesi of Saimaa. Kermajärvi is the main lake of Heinävesi Route, one of the two routes which Lake Kallavesi flows through to Saimaa (the other being Leppävirta Route). All the four rapids can be evaded with canals built around the turn of the 19th and 20th centuries named after the adjacent rapids. The northwest–southeast form shows the orientation of the moving Glacier in the latest Ice Age.

Heinävesi parish village is located on the southern shore of the lake.

A big part of the lake is protected in Natura 2000 conservation program (code FI0500011).

See also
List of lakes in Finland

References

External links
 

LKermajarvi
Lakes of Heinävesi